The 2010–11 Scottish First Division was the sixteenth season of the First Division in its current format of ten teams. Dunfermline Athletic finished champions, with Cowdenbeath and Stirling Albion being relegated.

Promotion and relegation from 2009–10

SPL & First Division
Relegated from Premier League to First Division
Falkirk

Promoted from First Division to Scottish Premier League
 Inverness Caledonian Thistle

First & Second Divisions
Relegated from First Division to Second Division
Ayr United
Airdrie United (via play-offs)

Promoted from Second Division to First Division
Stirling Albion
Cowdenbeath (via play-offs)

League table

Results
Teams play each other four times in this league. In the first half of the season each team plays every other team twice (home and away) and then do the same in the second half of the season, for a total of 36 games

First half of season

Second half of season

Top goalscorers
15 goals
  Kris Doolan (Partick Thistle)
  Mark Stewart (Falkirk)

13 goals
  John Baird (Raith Rovers)
  Andy Kirk (Dunfermline Athletic)

12 goals
  Colin McMenamin (Queen of the South)

11 goals
  Gordon Smith (Stirling Albion)

9 goals
  Pat Clarke (Dunfermline Athletic)
  Martin Hardie (Dunfermline Athletic)
  Sean Higgins (Dundee)
  Allan Jenkins (Greenock Morton)
  Willie McLaren (Queen of the South)
  Greg Stewart (Cowdenbeath)

First Division play-offs
Times are BST (UTC+1)

Semi-finals
The fourth placed team in the Second Division (Brechin City) will play the ninth placed team in the First Division (Cowdenbeath) and third placed team in the Second Division (Forfar Athletic) will play the second placed team in the Second Division (Ayr United). The play-offs will be played over two legs on Wednesday 11 May 2011 & Saturday 14 May 2011, the winning team in each semi-final will advance to the final on Wednesday 18 May 2011 & Sunday 22 May 2011.

First legs

Second legs

Final
The two semi-final winners will play each other over two legs. The winning team will be awarded a place in the 2011–12 First Division.

First leg

Second leg

Kits and shirt sponsors

Stadia

See also
 Scottish football referee strike

References

External links
2010–11 Scottish First Division at Soccerway

Scottish First Division seasons
1
2010–11 in Scottish football leagues
Scot